North Dakota Highway 91 (ND 91) is a  east–west state highway in the U.S. state of North Dakota. ND 91's western terminus is at U.S. Route 52 (US 52) in Harvey, and the eastern terminus is at ND 3 in Harvey.

Major intersections

References

091
Transportation in Wells County, North Dakota